Alvin Wiederspahn (January 18, 1949 – October 24, 2014) was an American politician and attorney who served as a member of the Wyoming House of Representatives (1979–1984) and Wyoming Senate (1985–1988).

Early life and education 
Wiederspahn was born in Cheyenne, Wyoming on January 18, 1949. He graduated from Cheyenne Central High School and later received a Bachelor of Science degree in zoology from the University of Wyoming and Juris Doctor from Sturm College of Law at the University of Denver.

Career 
After graduating from law school, Wiederspahn was admitted to the Wyoming State Bar and began practicing law in Cheyenne, Wyoming. A member of the Democratic Party, he served in the Wyoming House of Representatives from 1979 to 1984 and Wyoming Senate from 1985 until 1988.

Personal life 
Wiederspahn was the husband of Wyoming Senator Cynthia Lummis. They had one daughter, Annaliese.

Wiederspahn died of a heart attack in Cheyenne on October 24, 2014. He was buried at Beth El Cemetery. After Wiederspahn's death, Lummis dropped her bid for the chairmanship of the Republican Study Committee and opted not to seek a fifth term in Congress, retiring in 2017. Lummis went on to win the 2020 United States Senate election in Wyoming to replace the retiring incumbent Mike Enzi.

References

1949 births
2014 deaths
Cheyenne Central High School alumni
University of Wyoming alumni
Sturm College of Law alumni
Wyoming lawyers
Democratic Party members of the Wyoming House of Representatives
Democratic Party Wyoming state senators
Burials in Wyoming
People from Cheyenne, Wyoming
20th-century American lawyers